Ivo Rodrigues is the name of

Ivo Rodrigues (runner) (born 1960), Brazilian long-distance runner
Ivo Rodrigues (footballer) (born 1995), Portuguese footballer